Duplicity Remix EP is a 5-track remix EP by English trance metal band Silent Descent. It was released on February 22, 2010. The EP was released solely online in an attempt to appease high demand for new material.

Track listing

Personnel

Band members
 Tom Watling - Lead Vocals
 Tom Callahan - Guitar, Backing Vocals, Producer
 Paul Hurrell - Keyboard, Synths, Backing Vocals
 Kipster - DJ & Samples
 Jack "Jaco" Oxley - Lead Guitar, Backing Vocals
 Sniffles - Bass
 Dave Carter - Drums

References 

2010 EPs
2010 remix albums
Remix EPs
Silent Descent albums